Homayo is one of the principal Tewa Pueblo ancestral sites in New Mexico, US. Located on the west bank of the Rio Ojo Caliente, there are seven kivas. The village was well situated for defense, as it can be approached readily from the west side only. There is one main plaza or court which appears completely closed. Attached to this on the east are two sections which partially enclose another and smaller court. Three detached sections stand at a little distance from the main quadrangle.

References

Pueblo great houses
Archaeological sites in New Mexico
Puebloan buildings and structures
Native American history of New Mexico
Ruins in the United States
Former populated places in New Mexico
Tewa
Pueblos in New Mexico